Air Stereo is The Damnwells' second full-length album, released on August 15, 2006.

Track listing
All songs written by Alex Dezen. 
 "I've Got You" – 3:32
 "Accidental Man" – 4:29
 "You Don't Have to Like Me to Love Me (Tonight)" – 3:47
 "Golden Days" – 4:19
 "Louisville" – 4:33
 "Sell the Lie" – 3:34
 "Shiny Bruise" – 5:05
 "Heartbreaklist" – 3:55
 "Kung Fu Grip Kiss" – 4:29
 "I am a Leaver" – 4:59
 "Graceless" – 4:40
 "Keep a Little Organ" – 5:07
 "God Bless America" – 10:09
 "Air Stereo" (Bonus Track) – 4:18

Personnel
Alex Dezen - lead vocals, guitar, piano
David Chernis - lead guitar 
Ted Hudson - bass
Steven Terry - drums/percussion)

References

2006 albums